Tanisha Mukerji  is an Indian actress known for her works in Hindi, Telugu and Tamil films. Part of the Mukherjee-Samarth family, she is the daughter of filmmaker Shomu Mukherjee and actress Tanuja, and the younger sister of actress Kajol. She made her debut with the Hindi film Sssshhh... in 2003. She had her first hit with Ram Gopal Varma's Sarkar, appearing alongside Amitabh Bachchan and Abhishek Bachchan. She was a contestant on the reality show Bigg Boss 7, where she became the 1st runner-up.

Personal life
Tanishaa Mukerji is the daughter of Shomu Mukherjee, a Bengali Hindu Bollywood film director and his Marathi wife, veteran Bollywood actress Tanuja and is the younger sister of Bollywood actress Kajol. She was once in a relationship with her Big Boss 7 housemate, Armaan Kohli for a year before they broke up in October 2014.

Career

Film debut and breakthrough
Tanishaa got her first break in Bollywood with her film, Sssshhh... opposite Karan Nath. Her Tamil movie Unnale Unnale, opposite Vinay Rai was successful at the box office and got her a nomination at Vijay Awards for Best Debut Actress. In 2005, she played the female lead character of Nikkita Bakshi aka Nikki, in Neal N Nikki, opposite Uday Chopra. She was also seen in movies such as Popcorn Khao! Mast Ho Jao, Sarkar, Tango Charlie and many more.

Bigg Boss and further success
She participated in the television reality show Bigg Boss 7 and became the 1st runner-up. She was later seen as one of the judges in the stand-up comedy show Gangs of Haseepur. In 2016, Tanishaa participated in Fear Factor: Khatron Ke Khiladi 7 and became a finalist.

Filmography

Films 
 All films are in Hindi, otherwise noted

Television

See also
List of Indian film actresses

References

External links

Living people
Year of birth missing (living people)
Place of birth missing (living people)
Indian film actresses
Actresses in Tamil cinema
Bengali Hindus
Actresses in Bengali cinema
Marathi people
Actresses in Hindi cinema
Indian Hindus
21st-century Indian actresses
Bengali actresses
Actresses from Mumbai
Actresses in Telugu cinema
Bengali people
Actresses in Marathi cinema
Actresses in Hindi television
Indian television actresses
Bigg Boss (Hindi TV series) contestants
Fear Factor: Khatron Ke Khiladi participants